Graciane Finzi (born 10 July 1945) is a Morocco-born French composer.

Life
Graciane Finzi was born in Casablanca, Morocco, and studied music at the Casablanca Conservatory, then managed by Georges Friboulet, where her parents were teachers. She entered the Paris Conservatory at age ten, where she studied piano with Joseph Benvenuti and developed an interest in composition.

After completing her studies, she worked as a composer. She served as music director of the Festival de la Défense from 1975 to 1979, and began teaching at the Paris Conservatory in 1979. She served as vice-president of the International Society for Contemporary Music (SIMC) and of Société Nationale and as official representative to the Association Française d’Action Artistique (AFAA). She was composer-in-residence with the Lille National Orchestra from 2001 to 2003.

Honours and awards
 SACEM Grand Prix de la Promotion Symphonique
 Georges Enesco Prize
 SACEM Grand Prix
 SACD Prize for her opera "Pauvre Assassin", (premiered in Strasbourg, at Opéra du Rhin)

Works
Finzi's compositions often mix difference genres and folk styles. She composes for music theater, voice, solo instruments, chamber ensemble and orchestra, but is noted for opera. Selected works include:

 Il était tant de fois (1979)
 Les Chiens qui rêvent dans la nuit, Trio for flute, viola and harp (1982)
 Soleil vert for orchestra (1983)
 Pauvre assassin (1990)
 Ainsi la Vie for viola solo (1991)
 Espressivo for harpsichord and fixed sounds (1996)
 Le Dernier jour de Socrate (1997) opera with Jean-Claude Carrière
 La Tombée du jour (1998) text by Michel Schneider
 Brume de sable (1999)
 Ode à Dalí (2000) text by Federico García Lorca 
 Osmose for viola and guitar (2001)
 Errance dans la nuit (2002)
 Là-bas, peut-être, opera (2003)
 Quand un enfant voyage, opera (2004)
 Impression Tango for violin (or viola, or cello) and accordion (or piano) (2005)
 Le Clavier Fantastique, opera
 Concerto for amplified harpsichord and orchestra with cymbalum (2007)
 Kaddish (2009) 
 Concerto for viola and orchestra
 Nomade
 Alma Mareira

References

External links
Graciane Finzi website

1945 births
Living people
20th-century classical composers
20th-century French composers
20th-century French women musicians
21st-century classical composers
21st-century French composers
21st-century French women musicians
French women classical composers
French music educators
French opera composers
People from Casablanca
Women opera composers
Women music educators
20th-century women composers
21st-century women composers